Tava Maryanne Lennon Olsen (born 1969) is a New Zealand academic specialising in supply chain management. She is currently a full professor at the University of Auckland.

Academic career
After a 1994 PhD titled Response-time approximations for multi-server polling models, with manufacturing applications at the Stanford University, she worked at the University of Michigan and the Washington University in St Louis before moving  to the University of Auckland, rising to full professor.

Olsen has spoken on Auckland-related infrastructure issues, including the question of whether to move the Port of Auckland (no) and whether to introduce road tolls (yes).

Selected works 
 Fry, Michael J., Roman Kapuscinski, and Tava Lennon Olsen. "Coordinating production and delivery under a (z, Z)-type vendor-managed inventory contract." Manufacturing & Service Operations Management 3, no. 2 (2001): 151–173.
 Wiler, Jennifer L., Richard T. Griffey, and Tava Olsen. "Review of modeling approaches for emergency department patient flow and crowding research." Academic Emergency Medicine 18, no. 12 (2011): 1371–1379.
 Frater, Michael R., Tava M. Lennon, and Brian DO Anderson. "Optimally efficient estimation of the statistics of rare events in queueing networks." IEEE Transactions on Automatic Control 36, no. 12 (1991): 1395–1405.
 Oh, Seong-Jun, Tava Lennon Olsen, and Kimberly M. Wasserman. "Distributed power control and spreading gain allocation in CDMA data networks." In INFOCOM 2000. Nineteenth Annual Joint Conference of the IEEE Computer and Communications Societies. Proceedings. IEEE, vol. 2, pp. 379–385. IEEE, 2000.
 Katok, Elena, Tava Olsen, and Valery Pavlov. "Wholesale pricing under mild and privately known concerns for fairness." Production and Operations Management 23, no. 2 (2014): 285–302.

References

External links
 
  

Living people
1969 births
Stanford University alumni
Washington University in St. Louis faculty
University of Michigan faculty
Academic staff of the University of Auckland